The Seivika–Tømmervåg Ferry is a ferry service on County Road 680 across the Talgsjø channel in the Nordmøre district in the Norwegian county of Møre og Romsdal. It connects the Seivika ferry dock on the island of Nordlandet in the municipality of Kristiansund to the Tømmervåg ferry dock on the island of Tustna in the municipality of Aure. The route is operated by the transport conglomerate Fjord1.

The duration of the passage is 25 minutes, and the  route is served by MF Bjørnsund and MF Stordal with 32 departures per day in each direction every day. The route was served by MF Glutra from 2002 to 2010, when the vessel was damaged by a fire. In 2014 the annual average daily traffic was 690 vehicles and 596 passengers (ranking 20th in Norway).

References

External links
Seivika–Tømmervåg ferry schedule

Ferry transport in Møre og Romsdal